Bland is a surname thought to derive from Old English (ge)bland ‘storm’, ‘commotion’.  It is thought to have originated in an area in Yorkshire (where there is a place called Bland Hill)

It predates the adjective 'bland' meaning "characterless or uninteresting" which arrived in England around 1660.

The name maintains historical links with members of both the English and Scottish aristocracy.

Notable persons with that surname include:

 Alexander Bland (1866–1947), Welsh international rugby player
 Bill or Billy Bland, see William Bland (disambiguation)
 Bobby Bland (1930–2013), American singer
 Carl Bland (born 1961), American footballer
 Sir Christopher Bland (1938–2017), British politician
 Colin Bland (born 1938), Rhodesian cricketer
 DaRon Bland (born 1999), American football player
 Dave Bland (1929–2013), Australian rules footballer
 Edward Bland (1926–2013), American composer and musical director
 Edward David Bland (1848-1927), American politician
 Eleanor Taylor Bland (1944–2010), African-American writer of crime fiction
 Elizabeth Bland (fl. 1681–1712), Englishwoman celebrated for her knowledge of Hebrew
 Francis Bland (1882–1967), Australian politician
 Gordon Bland (born 1941), former English cricketer
 Hamilton Bland, BBC swimming commentator
 Harriet Bland (1915–1991), American athlete
 Harry Bland (1898–after 1934), English professional footballer
 Hubert Bland (1855–1914), British socialist and Fabian Society cofounder
 Hugh M. Bland (1898–1967), Justice of the Arkansas Supreme Court 
 Humphrey Bland (1686–1763), British Army general
 James A. Bland (1854–1911), African-American musician and songwriter
 Joanne Bland, American civil rights activist
 John Bland (disambiguation)
 Joseph Edward Bland (1866–1945), American politician
 Joyce Bland (1906–1963), British film actress
 June Bland (born 1931), British actress
 Leonard Thomas Bland (1851–1906), Canadian politician
 Malcolm Bland, New Zealand footballer
 Maria Bland (1769–1838), British singer
 Martin Bland (born 1947), British statistician
 Michael Bland (born 1969), American drummer
 Nate Bland (born 1974), American former Major League Baseball pitcher
 Sir Nevile Bland (1886–1972), British diplomat
 Oscar E. Bland (1877–1951), U.S. Representative from Indiana
 S. Otis Bland (1872–1950), U.S. Representative from Virginia
 Peregrine Bland (c.1596–1647), early Virginia settler and politician
 Peter Bland (born 1934), British-New Zealand poet and actor
 Rachael Bland (1978–2018), Welsh journalist and radio presenter
 Richard Bland (disambiguation)
 Rivett Henry Bland (1811–1894), early settler and a government administrator in colonial Australia.
 Robert G. Bland, American mathematician and operations researcher
 Roger Bland (born 1955), British curator and numismatist
 Salem Bland (1859–1950), Canadian Methodist theologian
 Sammy Bland (born 1929), American broadcaster and entertainer
 Sandra Bland (19872015), American woman found dead in a Texas jail cell
 Theodorick Bland (disambiguation)
 Tony Bland (1970-1993), an injured British man who was the subject of a notable court case
 Violet Bland (1863-1940), English Suffragette
 William Bland (disambiguation)

See also 

 Bland baronets of England in 17th and 18th centuries

References 

English-language surnames